John Ritson (born 6 September 1949) is an English-born former footballer, who played as a defender in the Football League in the 1960s and 1970s, most notably for Bolton Wanderers.
 
He joined the club as an apprentice and made his league debut in the 1967-68 season. He went on to play 324 league matches for the club, and was a member of the promotion-winning team of 1977-78.

However, following a contractual dispute he moved to Bury in the late 1970s and made over 40 league appearances for them, before moving into non-league football with Southport. Ritson made 12 appearances for Southport in 1980/81.

Following the end of his playing career, he ran a newsagents, and as of 2004 he was running his own builder's firm.

References

External links
 List of Southport games played at Port Online

Living people
Association football defenders
English Football League players
Bolton Wanderers F.C. players
Bury F.C. players
Southport F.C. players
1949 births
English footballers